Sport, Exercise, and Performance Psychology is a peer-reviewed academic journal published by the American Psychological Association7. The journal was established in 2011 and covers research "that supports the application of psychological principles to facilitate peak sport performance, enhance physical activity participation, and achieve optimal human performance". The current editor-in-chief is Maria Kavussanu (University of Birmingham).

Abstracting and indexing 
The journal is abstracted and indexed by PsycINFO, SCOPUS, and the Social Sciences Citation Index. According to the Journal Citation Reports, the journal has a 2020 impact factor of 4.25.

References

External links 
 

American Psychological Association academic journals
English-language journals
Publications established in 2011
Psychology journals
Quarterly journals
2011 establishments in Washington, D.C.